The Castejón Mountains are a mountain range in the Cinco Villas comarca, Aragon, Spain, located about  to the north of Zaragoza. They are named after the town of Castejón de Valdejasa in the midst of the range.

Description 
The Castejón Mountains are covered with low and mostly sparse forest made up mainly Carrasca (Quercus ilex) and pine trees, often subject to wildfires during droughts. The ridge's highest summit is Esteban (747 m). Other important summits are Guarizo (745 m), Pogallinero (639 m), Escalerilla (585 m) and Lomaza (476 m).

The northwestern part of the range is also known as Sierra de Erla, after the town of Erla, located further north, or as Montes de Sora, after the Sora Castle.

There are also wind turbines installed in some of the upper ridges.

See also 
Cinco Villas, Aragon
List of mountains in Aragon

References

External links 
 Tourism in Comarca of Cinco Villas
 Castejón de Valdejasa – Area Map
 Hiking in Montes de Castejón & El Jabalí – Wikiloc

Mountain ranges of Aragon